Bomarea gracilis is a species of flowering plant in the family Alstroemeriaceae. It is endemic to Ecuador. It grows in forest and páramo in the Andes.

References

gracilis
Endemic flora of Ecuador
Flora of the Andes
Páramo flora
Vulnerable plants
Taxonomy articles created by Polbot